Robert Patrick Fulton (6 November 1906 – 5 May 1979) was an amateur footballer from Northern Ireland who played as a left back.

Career

Club career
Fulton played club football in both Ireland and England for Larne, Belfast Celtic, London Caledonians and Dundalk.

International career
Fulton earned 21 caps for Ireland between 1928 and 1938; he also earned 21 caps for the Ireland Amateur team between 1925 and 1938. Fulton also represented Great Britain at the 1936 Summer Olympics.

References

External links
 

1906 births
1979 deaths
Association footballers from Northern Ireland
Pre-1950 IFA international footballers
Larne F.C. players
Belfast Celtic F.C. players
London Caledonians F.C. players
Dundalk F.C. players
Footballers at the 1936 Summer Olympics
Olympic footballers of Great Britain
Dual internationalists (football)
Northern Ireland amateur international footballers
Association football fullbacks